During the 2007–08 English football season, Charlton Athletic participated in the Football League Championship, having been relegated from the Premier League the previous season.

Kit
Charlton's kits were produced by Spanish company Joma. The club retained the sponsorship of the Spanish property company, Llanera, who declared bankruptcy during the season.

Season review

Pre-season
Pre-season was dominated by the transfer speculation involving England striker Darren Bent. A fee was agreed with West Ham United, but the player himself rejected the deal, instead choosing to join Tottenham Hotspur two weeks later for a club record sale of £17 million. A number of other key players, such as Jimmy Floyd Hasselbaink, Talal El Karkouri, Hermann Hreiðarsson Scott Carson and Alex Song, also left the club after relegation.

League review
After the first ten games of the season, Charlton were second in the league table, behind leaders Watford, having beaten Sheffield Wednesday, Crystal Palace, Norwich City, Leicester City and Hull City, drawn with Scunthorpe United, Colchester United, Coventry City and Barnsley and lost just once, to Stoke City. At the end of the season, Charlton finished 12th losing several matches, the worst being the embarrassing 3–0 loss to struggling Barnsley.

Players

Squad information

Transfers

In

Out

Results

Pre-season friendlies

Championship

FA Cup

League Cup

Starting 11
Considering starts in all competitions
 GK: #1,  Nicky Weaver, 48
 RB: #21,  Madjid Bougherra, 28
 CB: #6,  Paddy McCarthy, 31
 CB: #24,  Jonathan Fortune, 25
 LB: #15,  Chris Powell, 18 (#12,  Luke Varney, has 25 starts as a centre-forward)
 RM: #18,  Lloyd Sam, 28
 CM: #23,  José Semedo, 30
 CM: #8,  Matt Holland, 31
 LM: #11,  Darren Ambrose, 33
 AM: #5,  Zheng Zhi, 41
 CF: #16,  Chris Iwelumo, 32

References

Notes

Charlton Athletic F.C. seasons
Charlton Athletic